Tennyson High School is a public high school in Hayward, California, United States, formed in 1957.

Academics
Tennyson offers Advanced Placement classes such as:
Art History,
American Government and Politics,
Biology,
Calculus,
English Language,
English Literature,
European History,
Spanish Language,
Spanish Literature,
Statistics,
Studio Art: Drawing,
Studio Art: 2D Design,
Studio Art: 3D Design &
United States History.

Associated schools
Local schools which transition into Tennyson High include Cesar E. Chavez Middle School, King Middle School, Winton Middle School, and sometimes Ochoa Middle School.

Notable alumni

 Doug Henry, MLB baseball player
 Stacy A. Littlejohn, television writer

See also
Alameda County high schools

References

External links
 Tennyson High School website
 Hayward Unified School District website

Hayward Unified School District
High schools in Alameda County, California
Educational institutions established in 1957
Public high schools in California
1957 establishments in California
Buildings and structures in Hayward, California